Mark Perrett (born 18 July 1973) is a former Wales internaterional rugby league footballer who played in the 1990s.

Background
Perrett was born in Halifax, West Riding of Yorkshire, England, he has Welsh ancestors, and eligible to play for Wales due to the grandparent rule.

International career
Perrett played for Wales at the 1995 Rugby League World Cup.

References

External links
(archived by web.archive.org) World Cup 1995 details

1973 births
Living people
English people of Welsh descent
English rugby league players
Halifax R.L.F.C. players
Oldham R.L.F.C. players
Rugby league second-rows
Rugby league locks
Rugby league players from Halifax, West Yorkshire
Wales national rugby league team players